Bromerguride, also known as 2-bromolisuride, is an antidopaminergic and serotonergic agent of the ergoline group which was described as having atypical antipsychotic properties but was never marketed. It was the first antidopaminergic ergoline derivative to be discovered. The pharmacodynamic actions of bromerguride are said to be "reversed" relative to its parent compound lisuride, a dopaminergic agent.

References

Abandoned drugs
Atypical antipsychotics
Bromoarenes
Dopamine antagonists
Ergolines
Serotonin receptor antagonists
Serotonin receptor agonists
Ureas